The Laguna Mall, formerly Fisherman's Wharf, is a shopping centre in Hong Kong, located at 8 Laguna Verde Road, Hung Hom, within the residential complex of Laguna Verde. There are five floors. Floor LG to Floor 1 are occupied by shops, while the Floor 2 to 3 is the headquarters of CLP Power.

See also
 Fisherman's Wharfs in other places

References

External links

 Webpage about the Laguna Mall

Shopping centres in Hong Kong
Hung Hom
Kowloon City District
Shopping malls established in 2001